Blekinge archipelago is an archipelago in the Baltic Sea, located in Blekinge in the south of Sweden.

Geography
Blekinge archipelago stretches among almost the entire coastline of Blekinge, from west to east. The archipelago is dominated by a few large islands, Tjärö, Aspö, Hasslö, Tärnö and Sturkö, with smaller islands and skerries interspersed. In the whole archipelago area, some 85,000 people live, of whom 4,000 are islanders. The island of Utlängan is the farthest out to sea of the archipelago's islands; only the lighthouse rock Utklippan is farther out.

The landscape is a diverse cultural landscape, characterised by mainly a mix between oak pastures and deciduous forest. For its size, the archipelago exhibits an unusually high biodiversity. Endangered species who find a habitat in the archipelago include Osmoderma eremita and Lecanographa amylacea.

Culture
The towns of Karlshamn and Karlskrona are both located within the archipelago area; indeed, Karlskrona is mainly situated on Trossö island. The latter, having been founded as a naval base, is noted for its Baroque architecture and listed as a UNESCO World Heritage Site.

Shipbuilding has been a traditional local trade within the archipelago and the area is known for a traditional type of small boat, called blekingeeka and used for tasks like fishing and transporting stone locally.

In the 1970s, the local diving club discovered a shipwreck in the Blekinge archipelago that was eventually identified by archaeologists as Gribshunden, a 15th-century Danish warship. The shipwreck is significant as one of the best-preserved wreckages from the early modern period.

Gallery

References

Landforms of Blekinge County
Ramsar sites in Sweden
Archipelagoes of Sweden
Archipelagoes of the Baltic Sea